"Stay the Night" is the lead single from IMx's fifth album, Introducing IMx. It reached No. 23 on the Billboard Hot 100 singles chart and No. 20 on the Hot R&B/Hip-Hop Singles chart in late 1999. It was the group's most successful single as IMx, becoming their third single to earn a gold certification, achieving the feat on December 23, 1999, a little over two months after its release.

Music video

The video pays a homage to TLC's video "No Scrubs" (released several months prior) and Michael Jackson and Janet Jackson's video "Scream". The video was shot on July 31, 1999 and it begins with the boys dancing in a white room, right behind them it has the IMx logo on the wall. Marques start singing his verse while walking down the long hallway and seen on the TV screens while Young Rome and LDB were riding floating scooters. Marques is seen riding a floating scooter while singing the second verse. Young Rome is seen in a blue room. The next scene shows the boys playing baseball and trying to impress women. Alexis Fields and Shar Jackson make cameos. Fields would later work with IMx in House Party 4: Down to the Last Minute. Houston and Fields would work again later in the 2007 horror film, Somebody Help Me

Charts

Weekly charts

Year-end charts

References 

1999 singles
Songs written by Chris Stokes (director)
1999 songs
MCA Records singles
Songs written by Young Rome
IMx songs